Orthogonius dupuisi is a species of ground beetle in the subfamily Orthogoniinae. It was described by Basilewsky in 1948.

References

dupuisi
Beetles described in 1948